Baila Morena may refer to:

"Baila morena" (Lucenzo song)
"Baila morena" (Zucchero song)
"Morena", also known as "Baila morena", by Héctor & Tito from La Historia Live
"Baila morena", by Ardian Bujupi from the album 10 (2021)
"Baila morena", by Julio Iglesias from La Carretera
"Baila morena", by Los Caños from Los Caños (2000)
"Baila morena", by Tito El Bambino and J Quiles from El Muñeco (2020)

See also
Baila (disambiguation)